Zapryanov is a Bulgarian surname. Notable people with the surname include:

Dimitar Zapryanov (born 1960), Bulgarian judoka
Petar Zapryanov (born 1959), Bulgarian sports shooter
Zapryan Zapryanov (born 1994), Bulgarian footballer

Bulgarian-language surnames